Ira, or Ire (Ἱρὴ), was a town of ancient Messenia, mentioned by Homer in the Iliad, as one of the seven towns which Agamemnon offered to Achilles. It is identified with either the later Abia on the Messenian Gulf, or the later Eira. Its location necessarily depends on which identification is accepted.

References

Populated places in ancient Messenia
Former populated places in Greece
Locations in the Iliad
Lost ancient cities and towns